"Gypsy Rider" is a song written by Gene Clark, and performed by Clark and Carla Olson on the album So Rebellious a Lover, released 1987. The song was released as the A-side on a promo single the following year, given away for free with issue #24 of Bucketfull of Brains magazine. The B-side was "Flyaway" performed by The Seers.

Rolling Stone ranked "Gypsy Rider" as one of his 21 best songs.

Midnight Choir's version 

The Norwegian band Midnight Choir recorded a version of the song, which was released as a promotional single and on their debut album, both during 1994.

The song was also included on their compilation album, All Tomorrows Tears: The Best of Midnight Choir, released in 2005.

Personnel 
 Paal Flaata - Vocal
 Atle Byström - ??
 Ron Olsen - Bass guitar
 Mike Hardwick - Acoustic guitar
 Alison Young - Backing vocal
 Tore Wildhauer - Drums
 Andrew Hardin - Electric guitar (rhythm)

References 

1987 songs
1994 singles
Songs written by Gene Clark